Mohammed Najim is a former Iraqi football forward who played for Iraq between 1965 and 1966. He played in the 1966 Arab Nations Cup and scored in the famous 10–1 win against Bahrain.

References

Iraqi footballers
Iraq international footballers
Living people
Association football forwards
Year of birth missing (living people)